FK Pardubice 1899 was a Czech football club from the city of Pardubice, which played one season in the Czechoslovak First League, under the name of VCHZ Pardubice. It was founded as Explosia Semtín in 1925.

In 1961n then so called "VCHZ Pardubice" the club merged with "VTJ Dukla Parbubice" (this one founded as "Tankista Praha" where International goalkeeper Imre Stacho did its Military Service)

The club played in the 1968–69 Czechoslovak First League, reaching the final of the Czechoslovak Cup in the same season. The club played in the Czech 2. Liga between 1993 and 1997.

Historical names 
 1925 – Explosia Semtín
 1947 – Synthesia Semtín
 1948 – Sokol Synthesia Semtín
 1952 – Sokol Chemik Semtín
 1953 – Jiskra Semtín
 1958 – VCHZ Pardubice (1961 – merged with "VTJ Dukla Pardubice"(former "Tankista Praha")
 1990 – Synthesia Pardubice
 1993 – SK Pardubice
 1997 – FK Dropa Pardubice 1899
 1999 – FK Pardubice 1899

References

Football clubs in Czechoslovakia
Defunct football clubs in the Czech Republic
Czechoslovak First League clubs
Association football clubs established in 1925
Association football clubs disestablished in 2017
1925 establishments in Czechoslovakia
Sport in Pardubice
2017 disestablishments in the Czech Republic